Kevin Maciej Dąbrowski (born 9 June 1998) is a Polish professional footballer who plays as a goalkeeper for Queen of the South, on loan from Hibernian. Dabrowski has also had loan spells with Berwick Rangers, Civil Service Strollers,  Cowdenbeath and Dumbarton.

Career
Dąbrowski came through the youth systems at Ostrovia 1909 Ostrów Wielkopolski and Lech Poznań II, before he signed for Scottish club Hibernian in the summer of 2017.

He was loaned to Berwick Rangers in September 2018, returning to Hibs in October 2018. Dąbrowski was then loaned to Civil Service Strollers for a short period in November 2018.

Dąbrowski then signed for Cowdenbeath on loan for the first part of the 2019–20 season. He earned a man of the match award, and praise from the opposition manager Craig Levein, for his performance in a League Cup match against Hearts in July 2019.

On 8 September 2020, he joined Dumbarton on loan for the remainder of the season, but was recalled by Hibs in January 2021. On 27 April 2021, Dąbrowski signed a two-year contract extension at Hibs. 

Dąbrowski made his first team debut for Hibs on 1 February 2022, in a goalless draw with their Edinburgh derby rivals Hearts.

He suffered a shoulder injury in August 2022, which prompted Hibs to sign Ryan Schofield on loan. He was loaned to League One club Queen of the South in January 2023.

Career statistics

References 

1998 births
Living people
Footballers from Poznań
Polish footballers
Association football goalkeepers
Polish expatriate footballers
Expatriate footballers in Scotland
Polish expatriate sportspeople in Scotland
Lech Poznań II players
Lech Poznań players
Hibernian F.C. players
Berwick Rangers F.C.
Civil Service Strollers F.C players
Cowdenbeath F.C. players
Dumbarton F.C. players
III liga players
IV liga players
Scottish Professional Football League players
Queen of the South F.C. players